Sir Rhys Hopkin Morris (5 September 1888 – 22 November 1956) was a Welsh Liberal politician who was a Member of Parliament from 1923–1932 and from 1945–1956.

Early life
Morris was born at Blaencaerau, Maesteg, Glamorgan, son of John Morris, Congregational minister in Caerau, and Mary. He was educated at University of Wales, Bangor and at University College London from 1913 to 1914, graduating with Honours in Philosophy. He was admitted to Middle Temple on 10 January 1914. Morris served continually in the armed forces during the First World War from December 1914 until January 1919, possessing the rank of Lieutenant in the 2nd Battalion Royal Welsh Fusiliers by the end of the war and being twice wounded - the second time seriously. He was mentioned in dispatches and made an MBE (military division). After the war, he qualified as a barrister with special dispensations granted due to his service in the military, and was Called to the Bar on 2 July 1919.

His wife, who he met at Bangor and married in September 1918, was Gwladys Perrie Williams.

Political career
A classic laissez-faire liberal, Morris supported H. H. Asquith against David Lloyd George when the party split between 1916 and 1923, and would remain fiercely opposed to Lloyd George and interventionist Liberalism throughout his political career.

In 1922 Morris contested the general election as a pro-Asquith Liberal in Cardiganshire, narrowly losing to the sitting pro-Lloyd George Liberal MP Ernest Evans. The following year the Liberal Party reunited but Morris ran as an Independent Liberal against Evans. In one of the most surprising results of the 1923 general election Morris was elected. In the follow year's general election he was returned unopposed as an official Liberal candidate.

His opposition to both Lloyd George and the introduction of tariffs resulted in his remaining with the official ("Samuelite") Liberals when the party split three ways in advance of the 1931 general election. The following year Morris was appointed as a Metropolitan Police magistrate, a salaried post which vacated his seat because the post was an 'office of profit under the Crown' and incompatible with membership of the House of Commons. In 1936, he became the first Regional Director of the BBC in Wales. The same year Morris became President of the London Welsh Trust, which runs the London Welsh Centre, holding office until 1937.

Thirteen years later Morris returned to Parliament in a once more sensational result. In the 1945 general election he won Carmarthen, taking the seat from the Labour Party's Moelwyn Hughes despite the rest of the country experiencing a Labour landslide. Morris was to hold the seat for the remainder of his life.

In 1951 he became Deputy Chairman of Ways and Means in the House of Commons and thus one of the Deputy Speakers. This post, together with his age, combined to exclude him for consideration for the Liberal Party leadership when Clement Davies stood down in October 1956. Morris died the following month, aged 68.

Throughout his career Morris was a staunch individualist, once summing up his political philosophy as, "There is no man alive who is sufficiently good to rule the life of the man next door to him!" Many have regarded him as being the last representative of traditional Gladstonian Liberalism in the Commons.

See also
 Report of the Commission on the Palestine Disturbances of August, 1929, Cmd. 3530

Notes

Sources
 
Rhys Hopkin Morris: The Man and his Character by T J Evans, (Gomerian Press, Llandyssul), 1957
Sir Rhys Hopkin Morris by J Graham Jones, in Brack et al. (eds.) Dictionary of Liberal Biography (Politico's), 1998

Further reading
Rhys Hopkin Morris, The man and his character: T J Evans (introduction by Herbert Samuel), Gomerian Press, Llandyssul, 1958

External links 

1888 births
1956 deaths
Liberal Party (UK) MPs for Welsh constituencies
UK MPs 1923–1924
UK MPs 1924–1929
UK MPs 1929–1931
UK MPs 1931–1935
UK MPs 1945–1950
UK MPs 1950–1951
UK MPs 1951–1955
UK MPs 1955–1959
Knights Bachelor
Alumni of Bangor University
Welsh barristers
People from Maesteg
Members of the Parliament of the United Kingdom for Carmarthenshire constituencies
Members of the Order of the British Empire
Royal Welch Fusiliers officers
British Army personnel of World War I
Members of the Middle Temple
Members of the Parliament of the United Kingdom for Ceredigion
Stipendiary magistrates (England and Wales)